The 1927 Open Championship was the 62nd Open Championship, held 13–15 July at the Old Course in St Andrews, Scotland. Amateur Bobby Jones successfully defended the title with a dominating six-stroke victory, the second of his three victories at the Open Championship.

The regional qualification that had been used in 1926 was abandoned and the previous system of local qualifying just before the Open was reintroduced. Qualifying was held 11–12 July, Monday and Tuesday, with 18 holes on the Old Course and 18 holes on the New Course,  and the top 100 and ties qualified. In heavy rain early that flooded the bunkers, Jones shot 76 on Monday at the Old  and 71 on Tuesday at the New Course for 147, three strokes behind the low qualifier. Amateur Cyril Tolley led the field with 144; the qualifying score was 160 and 108 players advanced.

Prize money was increased £50 to £250, although the winner's share remained at £75.

Jones, age 25, returned to St Andrews to make amends for his first experience on the course; six years earlier in 1921, he walked off the Old Course in frustration during the third round. He shot 68 (−5) in the first round on Wednesday, three clear of the rest of the field, and after a second round 72 was at 140 (−6), two shots ahead of Bert Hodson and four clear of Joe Kirkwood Sr. To make the cut, players had to be within fourteen strokes of the leader after 36 holes; it was at 154 (+8) and 54 advanced.

On Friday, Hodson ballooned to 81 (+8) in the third round and Jones closed with 73-72 for 285, a new championship record. Aubrey Boomer and Fred Robson tied for second place, six shots back.

Future three-time champion Henry Cotton, age 20, made his Open debut and finished in ninth place. Five-time champion J.H. Taylor made his last cut in the Open at the age of 56.

Past champions in the field

Made the cut 

Source:

Missed the cut 

Source:

Did not advance past qualifying rounds (Monday & Tuesday):
Arnaud Massy (1907) 161, George Duncan (1920) 162.

Did not enter:
Walter Hagen (1922, 1924), Jock Hutchison (1921).

Round summaries

First round
Wednesday, 13 July 1927

Source:

Second round
Thursday, 14 July 1927

Source:

Third round
Friday, 15 July 1927 (morning)

Source:

Final round
Friday, 15 July 1927 (afternoon)

Source:

Amateurs: Jones (−7), Perkins (+8), Torrance (+8), Tweddell (+14),Harris (+15), Tolley (+15), de Montmorency (+17), Nettlefold (+26).

References

External links
St Andrews 1927 (Official site)

The Open Championship
Golf tournaments in Scotland
Open Championship
Open Championship
Open Championship